Rumson, New Jersey was incorporated on June 18, 1907. It is governed under the Borough form of New Jersey municipal government. The governing body consists of a Mayor and a Borough Council comprising six council members, with all positions elected at-large on a partisan basis as part of the November general election. A Mayor is elected directly by the voters to a four-year term of office. The Borough Council consists of six members elected to serve three-year terms on a staggered basis, with two seats coming up for election each year in a three-year cycle. The Borough form of government used by Rumson, the most common system used in the state, is a "weak mayor / strong council" government in which council members act as the legislative body with the mayor presiding at meetings and voting only in the event of a tie. The mayor can veto ordinances subject to an override by a two-thirds majority vote of the council. The mayor makes committee and liaison assignments for council members, and most appointments are made by the mayor with the advice and consent of the council.

Frank McMahon was the first mayor of Rumson, New Jersey. The current Mayor of Rumson, New Jersey is John E. Ekdahl.

Mayors

Notes

A.  Table only includes Borough mayors.  17 people have served as mayor, one twice; the table includes this non-consecutive term as well.

References

External links
 Red Bank Register - Mayor Teeter
 Obituary Mayor Paterno
 New Jersey State League of Municipalities Hall of Fame - Mayor Callman

 
Rumson